Nux may refer to:

 National Union of Ex-Service Men, a defunct association of military veterans in the United Kingdom
 Nux (newspaper), a student newspaper at the University of KwaZulu-Natal
 Nux (Mad Max character), one of the main characters in the film Mad Max: Fury Road
 NUX Organization, a Japanese record label
 "Nux" (poem), a Latin poem spuriously attributed to Ovid
 Strychnos nux-vomica, a species of deciduous tree native to India and Southeast Asia

See also